At least thirty-five languages indigenous to South Africa are spoken in the Republic, eleven of which are official languages of South Africa: Ndebele, Pedi, Sotho, Swati, Tsonga, Tswana, Venda, Xhosa, Zulu, Afrikaans, and English, which is the primary language used in parliamentary and state discourse, though all official languages are equal in legal status. Unofficial languages are protected under the Constitution of South Africa, though few are mentioned by any name. South African Sign Language has legal recognition but is not an official language, despite a campaign and parliamentary recommendation for it to be declared one.

Unofficial and marginalised languages include what are considered some of Southern Africa's oldest languages: Khoekhoegowab, !Orakobab, Xirikobab, N|uuki, !Xunthali, and Khwedam; and other African languages, such as SiPhuthi, IsiHlubi, SiBhaca, SiLala, SiNhlangwini (IsiZansi), SiNrebele (SiSumayela), IsiMpondo/IsiMpondro, IsiMpondomise/IsiMpromse/Isimpomse, KheLobedu, SePulana, HiPai, SeKutswe, SeṰokwa, SeHananwa, SiThonga, SiLaNgomane, SheKgalagari, XiRhonga, SeKopa (Sekgaga), and others. Most South Africans can speak more than one language, and there is very often a diglossia between the official and unofficial language forms for speakers of the latter.

Language demographics

The most common language spoken as a first language by South Africans is Zulu (23 percent), followed by Xhosa (16 percent), and Afrikaans (14 percent). English is the fourth most common first language in the country (9.6%), but is understood in most urban areas and is the dominant language in government and the media.

The majority of South Africans speak a language from one of the two principal branches of the Bantu languages that are represented in South Africa: the Sotho–Tswana branch (which includes Southern Sotho, Northern Sotho and Tswana languages officially), or the Nguni branch (which includes Zulu, Xhosa, Swati and Ndebele languages officially). For each of the two groups, the languages within that group are for the most part intelligible to a native speaker of any other language within that group.

The indigenous African languages of South Africa which are official, and therefore dominant, can be divided into two geographical zones, with Nguni languages being predominant in the south-eastern third of the country (Indian Ocean coast) and Sotho-Tswana languages being predominant in the northern third of the country located further inland, as also in Botswana and Lesotho. Gauteng is the most linguistically heterogeneous province, with roughly equal numbers of Nguni, Sotho-Tswana and Indo-European language speakers, with Khoekhoe influence. This has resulted in the spread of an urban argot, Tsotsitaal or S'Camtho/Ringas, in large urban townships in the province, which has spread nationwide.

Tsotsitaal in its original form as "Flaaitaal" was based on Afrikaans, a language derived from Dutch, which is the most widely spoken language in the western half of the country (Western and Northern Cape). It is spoken as first language by approximately 61 percent of whites and 76 percent of Coloureds. This racial term is popularly considered to mean "multiracial", as it represents to some degree a creole population many of whom are descendants of slave populations imported by the Vereenigde Oostindische Compagnie (VOC) from slaving posts in West and East Africa, and from its colonies of the Indian Ocean trade route.

Political exiles from the VOC colony of Batavia were also brought to the Cape, and these formed a major influencing force in the formation of Afrikaans, particularly in its Malay influence, and its early Jawi literature. Primary of these was the founder of Islam at the Cape, Sheikh Abadin Tadia Tjoessoep (known as Sheikh Yusuf). Hajji Yusuf was an Indonesian noble of royal descent, being the nephew of the Sultan Alauddin of Gowa, in today Makassar, Nusantara. Yusuf, along with 49 followers including two wives, two concubines and twelve children, were received in the Cape on 2 April 1694 by governor Simon van der Stel. They were housed on the farm Zandvliet, far outside of Cape Town, in an attempt to minimise his influence on the VOC's slaves. The plan failed however; Yusuf's settlement (called Macassar) soon became a sanctuary for slaves and it was here that the first cohesive Islamic community in South Africa was established. From here the message of Islam was disseminated to the slave community of Cape Town, and this population was foundational in the formation of Afrikaans. Of particular note is the Cape Muslim pioneering of the first Afrikaans literature, written in Arabic Afrikaans, which was an adaptation of the Jawi script, using Arabic letters to represent Afrikaans for both religious and quotidian purposes.  It also became the de facto national language of the Griqua (Xiri or Griekwa) nation, which was a mixed race group.

Afrikaans is also spoken widely across the centre and north of the country, as a second (or third or even fourth) language by Black South Africans (which, in South Africa, popularly means SiNtu-speaking populations) living in farming areas.

The 2011 census recorded the following distribution of first language speakers:

Demographics

Other significant languages in South Africa 
Other languages spoken in South Africa not mentioned in the Constitution, include many of those already mentioned above, such as KheLobedu, SiNrebele, SiPhuthi, as well as mixed languages like Fanakalo (a pidgin language used as a lingua franca in the mining industry), and Tsotsitaal or S'Camtho, an argot that has found wider usage as an informal register.
 
Many unofficial languages have been variously claimed to be dialects of official languages, which largely follows the Apartheid practice of the Bantustans, wherein minority populations were legally assimilated towards the official ethnos of the Bantustan or "Homeland".

Significant numbers of immigrants from Europe, elsewhere in Africa, China, and the Indian subcontinent (largely as a result of the British Indian indenture system) means that a wide variety of other languages can also be found in parts of South Africa. In the older immigrant communities there are: Greek, Gujarati, Hindi, Portuguese, Tamil, Telugu, Bhojpuri, Awadhi, Urdu, Yiddish, Italian and smaller numbers of Dutch, French and German speakers. Older Chinese tend to speak Cantonese or Hokkien, but recent immigrants mainly speak Mandarin Chinese.

These non-official languages may be used in limited semi-official use where it has been determined that these languages are prevalent. More importantly, these languages have significant local functions in specific communities whose identity is tightly bound around the linguistic and cultural identity that these non-official SA languages signal.

The fastest growing non-official language is Portuguese – first spoken by immigrants from Portugal, especially Madeira and later black and white settlers and refugees from Angola and Mozambique after they won independence from Portugal and now by more recent immigrants from those countries again – and increasingly French, spoken by immigrants and refugees from Francophone Central Africa.

More recently, speakers of North, Central and West Africa languages have arrived in South Africa, mostly in the major cities, especially in Johannesburg and Pretoria, but also Cape Town and Durban.

Angloromani is spoken by the South African Roma minority.

Constitutional provisions
Chapter 1 (Founding Provisions), Section 6 (Languages) of the Constitution of South Africa is the basis for government language policy.

The English text of the constitution signed by president Nelson Mandela on 16 December 1996 uses (mostly) the names of the languages expressed in those languages themselves. Sesotho refers to Southern Sotho, and isiNdebele refers to Southern Ndebele.  The Interim Constitution of 1993 referred to Sesotho sa Leboa, while the 1996 Constitution used "Sepedi" for the title of the Northern Sotho language.

The constitution mentions "sign language" in the generic sense rather than South African Sign Language specifically.

The Constitution of South Africa in Various Languages
The following is from the preamble to the Constitution of South Africa:

See also

National Language Services
Official names of South Africa
Commission for the Promotion and Protection of the Rights of Cultural, Religious and Linguistic Communities

References

External links
 Introduction to the languages of South Africa
 Ethnologue Listing of South African Languages
 PanAfriL10n page on South Africa
 Statistics SA
 Hornberger, Nancy H. "Language Policy, Language Education, Language Rights: Indigenous, Immigrant, and International Perspectives." Language in Society, Vol. 27, No. 4 (Dec., 1998), pp. 439–458
 Alexander, Mary. The 11 languages of South Africa (January 2018)

 
Articles containing video clips